Peter Mikhailovich Bogaevsky (or Bogayevsky) (() (() (January 23, 1866 — January 29, 1929) was a professor of international law in the Russian Empire. He was a professor at Tomsk University and later at Kiev University where he founded and directed the Kiev Institute for Near East.  Following the Socialist revolution, he fled as an emigre to Sofia, Bulgaria where he assumed the post of professor of international law at the University of Sofia. With Stefan Bobchev he founded the Free University of Political and Economic Science. It was then also known as the Balkan Institute of the Near East, and was a private, but state-recognized institute which drew on the Ecole des Sciences Politiques as a model, and offered courses in diplomatic and consular services, administration and finance, and other areas.

References

See also
List of Russian legal historians
Scholars in Russian law

Lawyers from the Russian Empire
Legal historians
Historians from the Russian Empire
1866 births
1929 deaths
Academic staff of Tomsk State University
White Russian emigrants to Bulgaria
Emigrants from the Russian Empire to Bulgaria
Academic staff of Sofia University
University of National and World Economy